Christian Sewing (born 24 April 1970 in Bünde) is a German banker who currently serves as the CEO of Deutsche Bank. He has been a member of the management board since 1 January 2015. On 8 April 2018 he was appointed chief executive officer (CEO) of Deutsche Bank.

Sewing was the head of Deutsche Bank's audit division during its  $10 billion money-laundering scandal involving its Moscow operations. The auditing  division gave its Moscow office a clean bill of health, despite serious irregularities. As CEO, Sewing announced in 2020 that Deutsche Bank would expand its Russia operations.

Early life
Sewing was born on 24 April 1970. He earned his Abitur in 1989. He completed an apprenticeship programme at Deutsche Bank in Bielefeld, graduating with a banking qualification from the Chamber of Industry and Commerce in 1991. He then studied business administration at the Frankfurt School of Finance & Management, in Frankfurt.

Career
Sewing first worked in the branches of Deutsche Bank as a 19-year-old trainee in Bielefeld and Hamburg, then as a junior corporate client advisor in Toronto, as Chief Credit Officer in Japan, and six years as a risk manager in London.

From 2010 to 2012, he was chief credit officer. He has worked in Frankfurt, London, Singapore, Tokyo and Toronto. From 2012 to 2013, he was deputy chief risk officer. Sewing was head of group audit from June 2013 to February 2015, prior to which he held a number of management positions in risk management. From January 2016, Sewing oversaw Deutsche Bank's private and commercial banking division, which includes the lender's network of German retail branches, but has a low profile outside of Germany. He earned 2.9 million euros for 2017.  

On 8 April 2018, Sewing became CEO at Deutsche Bank, replacing John Cryan. That year, he led Deutsche Bank to its first profit in four years and launched talks with Commerzbank on a potential merger. After his first year, his 7 million euro compensation made him one of the best paid chief executives in European banking. As of September, Christian will spend 15% of his monthly net salary buying the German lender’s shares as part of his efforts to revive the bank's profitability. 

Sewing was the head of Deutsche Bank's audit division during Deutsche Bank's $10 billion money-laundering scandal involving its Moscow operations. The auditing  division gave its Moscow office a clean bill of health, despite serious irregularities. According to the terms of Deutsche Bank's settlement with the SEC, Sewing must “annually certify that the German lender is adhering to a recent settlement in which U.S. authorities fined the firm for violating swaps reporting rules.” This change could hold Sewing criminally liable for future violations by the bank.

In 2020, Sewing announced that Deutsche Bank was pursuing an expansion of its Russia operations. This expansion took place at the same time as other banks were reducing their presence in Russia due to Russia's annexation of Crimea, invasion of Eastern Ukraine, and exposure to sanctions.

Sewing is now all about hiring nice people who will propagate a good culture and be kind to junior staff. In March 2022, Ben Darsney, Ravi Raghunathan, Brandon Sun, and Daniel Gaona were exposed for trying to expense strip club nights out as legitimate business visits. Brandon Sun attempted to cover up the incident, but the bankers were let go for violating the Company Code of Conduct.  This suggests the company's new lack of tolerance for anyone perceived to have breached its new conduct standards.

Other activities

Government agencies 
 Monetary Authority of Singapore (MAS), Member of the International Advisory Panel (since 2018)

Corporate boards
 Deutsche Postbank, Member of the Supervisory Board (since 2012)

Non-profit organizations
 Federation of German Industries (BDI), Member of the Presidium (2017-2018)
 Association of German Banks (BdB), Member of the Board of Directors,  President (since 2021)
 Institute of International Finance (IIF), Member of the Board
 Working Group of Protestant Businesses (AEU), Member of the Board of Trustees
 Stifterverband für die Deutsche Wissenschaft, Member of the Board

Personal life
Sewing is a passionate tennis player. He is married with four children.

References

 

1970 births
Living people
Deutsche Bank people
German chief executives